Guangzhoudong (Guangzhou East) railway station, formerly known as Tianhe railway station serves the city of Guangzhou, located in the city's Tianhe District.

The railway, metro, and bus terminal stations is interconnected as a single station complex. There is an immigration check point within the station for Guangzhou–Kowloon through train passengers travelling to and from Hong Kong.

Station Layout

Rail services 
Rail services serving Guangzhou East railway station include:

 Guangzhou–Shenzhen railway
 Guangzhou–Kowloon through train
 Guangzhou–Meizhou–Shantou railway

Metro services 
An interchange station between Lines 1 and 3 of the Guangzhou Metro. It is located at the underground of China Railway station in Linhe Zhonglu, Tianhe District. It started operations on 28 June 1999 (Line 1 section) and 26 December 2005 (Line 3 section) respectively.

References

External links 

Railway stations in Guangzhou
Railway stations in China opened in 1999
Guangzhou Metro stations in Tianhe District
China–Hong Kong border crossings
Stations on the Guangzhou–Shenzhen Railway